Merchant Taylors may refer to:
Merchant Taylors' School, Northwood (Hertfordshire)
Merchant Taylors' Prep School (Hertfordshire)
Merchant Taylors' Boys' School, Crosby (Merseyside)
Merchant Taylors' Girls' School, Crosby

See also
Worshipful Company of Merchant Taylors